The South Africa National Blind Cricket Team represents South Africa in blind cricket, a version of the sport of cricket adapted for blind and partially sighted players.

History 
In 2014, South Africa had its 40-over national blind cricket championship in Cape town. Northens Blind Cricket club won the tournament by taking 50 wickets in 5 games and not allowing any of its competitors to bat through their innings.

Pretoria Transnet Blind Cricket Club is South Africa's biggest blind cricket club. They played a friendly T20 blind cricket match against The South African Indoor team as well as local able bodied teams. They performed consistently well during the early contests, winning the 1998 inaugural edition of the Blind Cricket World Cup,  taking the final by ten wickets against Pakistan.

The cricketers were awarded for their strong display in the 1998 Blind Cricket World Cup:

(A) Best Batsmen 

(A) Best Player 

(B) Players of the series

Rury Field and Scott Field (More than 1700 runs)

(D) Winners Trophy was presented to South Africa Blind cricket team.

The team performed well in the 2nd edition of the 2002 Blind Cricket World Cup. They eventually lost to Pakistan in the finals.

Key Milestone 
South Africa and Pakistan played in the inaugural Blind cricket test match in 2000 when Pakistan recorded a 94 run victory.

Tournament History

40 Over Blind Cricket World Cup 
 1998 Blind Cricket World Cup - Champions
 2002 Blind Cricket World Cup - Runners up
 2006 Blind Cricket World Cup - Group stage
 2014 Blind Cricket World Cup - Semifinals

Blind T20 World Cup 
 2012 Blind World T20 - Groupstage
 2017 Blind World T20 - Groupstage

References 

Blind cricket teams
B
Parasports in South Africa
C